The Metsantan Range are a mountain range between the upper Stikine and the Finlay River drainages in northern British Columbia, Canada. It has an area of 1116 km2 and is a subrange of the Omineca Mountains which in turn form part of the Interior Mountains.

See also
Metsantan Pass
Metsantan Peak
Metsantan Lake
Toodoggone River

References

Omineca Mountains
Northern Interior of British Columbia